Muhammad Wali Kermashani (in Kurdish Mihemmed Wely Kirmaşanî (1901-?) was a Kurdish poet from the city of Kermanshah from Eastern Kurdistan - also known as Iranian Kurdistan).

External links
 
 

People from Kermanshah
1901 births
Kurdish poets
Year of death missing
20th-century Iranian poets